Crox Ernesto Acuña Rodriguez (born June 23, 1990 in Maracay, Aragua, Venezuela) is an Olympic and national record-holding swimmer from Venezuela.

Participation 
He swam for Venezuela at the:
2006 South American Games
2006 Central American & Caribbean Games
2007 World Championships
2007 Pan American Games
South American Swimming Championships 2008
2008 Olympics
2009 World Championships
2010 South American Games
2012 Summer Olympics

References

1990 births
Living people
Venezuelan male swimmers
Swimmers at the 2008 Summer Olympics
Swimmers at the 2012 Summer Olympics
Swimmers at the 2007 Pan American Games
Swimmers at the 2011 Pan American Games
Olympic swimmers of Venezuela
Pan American Games bronze medalists for Venezuela
Pan American Games medalists in swimming
South American Games gold medalists for Venezuela
South American Games silver medalists for Venezuela
South American Games bronze medalists for Venezuela
South American Games medalists in swimming
Central American and Caribbean Games gold medalists for Venezuela
Competitors at the 2006 South American Games
Competitors at the 2010 South American Games
Competitors at the 2006 Central American and Caribbean Games
Central American and Caribbean Games medalists in swimming
Medalists at the 2007 Pan American Games
Medalists at the 2011 Pan American Games
Sportspeople from Maracay
20th-century Venezuelan people
21st-century Venezuelan people